This is a list of countries by tobacco consumption and cigarette consumption per capita.

As of 2014, cigarettes were smoked by over 1 billion people, nearly 20% of the world's population then. About 800 million of those smokers were male. While smoking rates have stagnated or decreased in developed nations, the tobacco consumption in developing nations is increasing, especially among men.

As of 2018, tobacco use has massively decreased since the 1950s and is projected to decrease even faster in the future.

More than 80% of all smokers now live in countries with low or middle incomes, and 60% in just 10 countries, a list headed by China. China is the world's most populated country, and is also the leading country in the cigarette industry. In 2014, China produced and consumed more than 30% of the cigarettes in the world. There is a strong relationship between socioeconomic status (SES) and smoking behaviours. According to research, developing countries have the highest rate of tobacco use. "China was found to be one of the countries with the highest male-to-female ratio of smoking prevalence": 74% of males and 8% of females were smokers.

Smoking rates in the United States dropped by half from 1965 to 2006, from 42% to 20.8% of adults, with further significant decreasing to 14% by 2018. There are large regional differences in smoking rates.

In Australia, the incidence of smoking is decreasing, with figures from 2018 showing 16.2% of the population (over 15) to be smokers, a decline from 27.6% in 2000. Young adults are the most likely age group to smoke, with a marked decline in smoking rates with increasing age. The prevalence of smoking is strongly associated with socioeconomic disadvantage (low earners), with over double the rate in the most disadvantaged quintile of the population as compared to the least. Smoking rates in rural areas tend to be higher than in city areas.

Cigarette consumption 

This list is biased for some of the countries with the highest consumption, such as Andorra, Luxembourg and Belgium. These countries are known to sell cigarettes at lower prices than their neighbours, and as such attract foreign buyers. Andorra, for instance, is known for its duty-free shops where Europeans can find alcohol, cigarettes, electronics and clothes which can be up to 20 percent cheaper than in the neighbouring countries.

The worldwide average is 1,083 cigarettes per year per person above the age of 14.

See also
Prevalence of tobacco use

References

Sources
World Cancer Report 2014. World Health Organization. 2014. Chapter 2.1. .
"A Single Dose of Nicotine Enhances Reward Responsiveness in Nonsmokers: Implications for Development of Dependence" 

 

Tobacco consumption
Tobacco